The 12815 / 12816 Nandan Kanan Express is an Express train belonging to Indian Railways East Coast Railway zone that runs between  and  in India.

It operates as train number 12815 from Puri to Anand Vihar Terminal and as train number 12816 in the reverse direction, serving the states of Odisha, West Bengal, Jharkhand, Bihar, Uttar Pradesh, and Delhi.

Background
This train is named after the Nandankanan Zoological Park, a  zoo and botanical garden in Bhubaneswar, Odisha, India. Established in 1960, it was opened to the public in 1979 and became the first zoo in India to join World Association of Zoos and Aquariums (WAZA) in 2009. It also contains a botanical garden and part of it has been declared a sanctuary. Nandankanan, literally meaning The Garden of Heaven, is located near the capital city, Bhubaneswar, in the environs of the Chandaka forest, and includes the  Kanjia lake.

Coaches
The 12815 / 12816 Nandan Kanan Express has 1 AC First Class, 2 AC 2 Tier, 6 AC 3-tier, 7 sleeper class, 2 General unreserved, 1 Divyangjan Coach & 1 EOG (Generator cum brake van). It carries a pantry car.

As is customary with most train services in India, coach composition may be amended at the discretion of Indian Railways depending on demand.

Service

As the average speed of the train is slightly above , as per railway rules, its fare includes a Superfast surcharge.

This Train runs from New Delhi till May 2018 but changed to Anand Vihar Terminal instead of New Delhi.

Routing

Traction
As the route is fully electrified, a  Ghaziabad based WAP-7 locomotive powers the train from Puri to Anand Vihar Terminal.

References

External links
 12815 Nandankanan Express at India Rail Info
 12816 Nandankanan Express at India Rail Info

Named passenger trains of India
Transport in Delhi
Rail transport in Delhi
Rail transport in Jharkhand
Rail transport in Bihar
Rail transport in Uttar Pradesh
Rail transport in Odisha
Rail transport in West Bengal
Transport in Puri
Express trains in India